The Neuve-Chapelle Indian Memorial is a World War I memorial in France, located on the outskirts of the commune of Neuve-Chapelle, in the département of Pas-de-Calais. The memorial commemorates some 4,742 Indian soldiers with no known grave, who fell in battle while fighting for the British Indian Army in the First World War. The location of the memorial was chosen because of the participation by Indian troops at the Battle of Neuve Chapelle.

History 
The memorial, designed by Sir Herbert Baker, with sculpture by Charles Wheeler, is a circular enclosure centred on a tall pillar that is topped by a lotus capital, and carved representations of the Star of India and the Imperial Crown. One half of the circular enclosure consists of the panels of names of the dead, while the other half is open. Other architectural and sculptural features of the memorial include carved stone tigers, and two small domed chattris. At the foot of the pillar is a Stone of Remembrance inscribed with the words: "Their name liveth for evermore." The main inscription is in both English and French, while the column also bears an inscription in English, Arabic, Devanagari and Gurmukhi: "God is One, His is the Victory".

The memorial was unveiled by F. E. Smith, 1st Earl of Birkenhead, on 7 October 1927. The Earl of Birkenhead, who was present in his role as Secretary of State for India, had served in France in World War I from 1914 to 1915 as a staff officer with the Indian Corps, and later co-wrote an official history titled The Indian Corps in France (1917, revised edition 1919). Also present at the unveiling ceremony was Marshal Ferdinand Foch, who gave a speech in French. Attending the ceremony was a contingent of troops from India to represent the units that fought in France, including Sikhs, Dogras, and Garhwalis. Foch's speech included the following addressed to them:

Later additions to the memorials commemorated other Indian Army dead of both World Wars.

There are two recipients of the Victoria Cross are commemorated on the Neuve-Chapelle Memorial: Gabar Singh Negi and William Arthur McCrae Bruce.

Prime ministerial visit 
The memorial was the site for commemorations during the First World War centenary years, including a visit in April 2015 by the Prime Minister of India Narendra Modi. The Indian national anthem was played, a silence held, and a wreath laid. Modi wrote in the visitor's book:

Footnotes and references

External links

Details of the Neuve-Chapelle Indian Memorial on the Commonwealth War Graves Commission website
Details of the Neuve-Chapelle Indian Memorial on the WW1 Cemeteries website
Battle of Neuve-Chapelle, picture of memorial at time of construction and close-ups of architectural details, on the World War One Battlefields website
The Indian Memorial at Neuve-Chapelle on the National Archives website
Sikhs And The Great War In France, on the United Sikhs website

Indian Army
Commonwealth War Graves Commission memorials
World War I memorials in France
Buildings and structures completed in 1927
Monuments and memorials in the Pas-de-Calais